West De Pere High School is one of two public high schools in De Pere, Wisconsin, USA. Built in 1960, it serves students in the 9th to the 12th grade. The school's mascot is the Phantom. The Phantoms compete in the Bay Conference.

History 
In 2018, a referendum passed to add a second-story addition to the high school. The referendum has been somewhat controversial because of the needed increase in taxes to pay for the expansion.

Demographics 
WDP is 83 percent white, seven percent Native American, four percent black, three percent Hispanic and one percent Asian. Two percent of students identify as a part of two or more races.

Achievements 
The pom and dance team has won nine state titles since 2001. (2001-Pom, 2002-Pom, 2003-Pom, 2004-Pom, 2007-Pom, 2008-Pom & Kick, 2009-Kick, 2012-Kick)
The Phantom baseball team won the Division 2 state baseball championship in 2008.
The Phantom football team won the Division 3 state football championship in 2010 and 2011.
The Marching Phantoms won the state marching title in 2002, 2003, and 2004.

Performing arts 
West De Pere formerly had a competitive show choir, "The Phantasmics".

Notable alumni 
Jason Berken, baseball player
Charlie Hill, comedian and actor
Joseph F. Martin, former justice of the Wisconsin Supreme Court (1935–1946)
Jerome Van Sistine, former member of the Wisconsin State Assembly
Paul Wilmet, baseball player

References

External links
 School District of West Deper

Public high schools in Wisconsin
Schools in Brown County, Wisconsin
Educational institutions established in 1960
1960 establishments in Wisconsin
De Pere, Wisconsin